"The Prodigal" is episode 15 of season 1 in the television show Angel. Written by Tim Minear and directed by Bruce Seth Green, it was originally broadcast on February 22, 2000 on the WB network. In this episode, Detective Kate Lockely learns her father has been spending his retirement as a mule for a syndicate of demon drug-runners. In response to investigative pressure from Angel, the demon drug lord orders Kate's father killed. Flashbacks show the human Angel struggling with his own father in 1753, incorporating scenes first shown in the Buffy the Vampire Slayer episode "Becoming (Part 1)", and remind viewers that Angel killed his family after being turned into a vampire by Darla.

Plot
In a flashback to Galway, Ireland, 1753, Angel - at that point, still human and known as "Liam"  - is fighting with his father. Enraged by his son's chronic recklessness and current mocking demeanor, Liam's father slaps his son in the face, shouting that he'll always be a layabout and a scoundrel. In the present, Angel is fighting a demon that is dressed like a homeless person on the train tracks in an L.A. subway tunnel. As Detective Kate Lockley arrives on the scene, the demon clutches its chest, sinks to the ground and expires. Forced again to deal with L.A.'s dark side and Angel's place in it, Kate ironically wonders whether she should call the coroner or Hazardous Materials, while Angel tries to convince her not to report the supernatural aspects of this case. Later, as an officer interviews the Blue Circle courier who pulled the emergency cord after allegedly being attacked by "your average Joe-stink homeless guy," Angel's instincts are immediately aroused when he spots Kate's dad, retired police detective Trevor Lockley, take a package from the crime scene.

At Angel Investigations, Angel identifies the demon in one of Wesley's reference books as a Kwaini demon, an inherently non-violent race. Angel visits Kate at the precinct, but as he explains that something must have set off the Kwaini demon in the subway, Kate interrupts, preferring that he say "evil thing" instead of "demon." He is unable to convince Kate that the demon she saw dead in the subway is not an evil evil thing. Kate  is reluctant to admit that his news means that this case is not as routine as they initially believed. The AI team splits up to pursue their two leads. Angel, suspicious that the Blue Circle courier was on a train during his shift, follows him to an apartment building, where Trevor Lockley opens the door to the courier's knock and shoves a brown-wrapped package into the man's hands. Once the courier leaves, Angel confronts Trevor about the exchange, theorizing Trevor was returning the parcel he removed from the crime scene that morning. Intending to discover who Trevor is working for, Angel gives Kate's father a chance to come clean so they can take care of the problem without further police involvement. Taking umbrage at Angel's angry implication that he cares nothing for his daughter, Trevor tells Angel that he can't possibly interpret a father's actions, and slams the door in his face. After locating the Kwaini's body in the subway tunnel, Wesley performs an autopsy which reveals the demon was on drugs, and attacked the train because someone on board had more of the drug.

In Galway, Liam tearfully bids goodbye to his mother and younger sister, and exchanges more harsh words with his father. Making his way back to the pub, Liam spends the remainder of the day carousing wildly. An elegantly dressed Darla watches in fascination as a very drunk Liam brawls with beautiful abandon, besting several men in quick succession. That night, luring the vulnerable young man into a dark alley with promises of exotic experiences and places, Darla sires Liam, first biting him, then drawing her own blood for him to drink in turn. That night, Liam rises from his grave and is greeted by Darla. She watches as he morphs and kills his first human. Liam adopts the vampiric name 'Angelus' when his younger sister sees him coming home and mistakes him for an angel. Angelus subsequently kills nearly the entire population of his village, including his sister, mother, and father, but leaving a few alive so that they will spread the vampire's reputation.

Two men in suits visit Trevor Lockley to make sure he hasn't said anything to his daughter. Angel arrives to warn Trevor of the danger in which he's involved, but before he can convince Mr. Lockley to invite him inside, the men in suits reveal themselves as vampires and kill Trevor. Kate arrives and finds her father dead. She trails the vampires to the demon drug lord's base, then stakes the vampire who killed her father. Angel shows up, helping her fight and kill the remaining vampires. Angel finally chops off the head of the lead demon. Kate walks away, saying that her father was human, and Angel doesn't know anything about that. Back in Angel's past, Darla finds that Angelus has killed all of his family. She reminds him that even though his father is dead, his memory will always haunt him. Kate visits her father's grave while Angel watches from the safety of the shadows.

Production details
When Liam rises from the grave, his breath (and Darla's) is clearly visible. Because vampires have no body heat, they are always at air temperature. Without a temperature differential, vapor cannot condense. Producer Tim Minear explains it was cold while they filmed this scene, shot on location at Hollywood Forever Cemetery behind Paramount Pictures, and there wasn't a large enough budget to remove the actors' breath digitally.

References

External links

 

Angel (season 1) episodes
2000 American television episodes
Television episodes about dysfunctional families
Fiction about familicide
Television episodes set in Ireland
Television episodes about illegal drug trade
Television episodes written by Tim Minear